Social Marketing Quarterly is a quarterly peer-reviewed academic journal covering social marketing. The editors are Sameer Deshpande and Jude McDivitt. The Managing Editor is Tina Robinette. It was established in 1994 and is published by SAGE Publications in association with FHI360.

Abstracting and indexing 
The journal is abstracted and indexed in:
 CAB Abstracts
 Business Source Complete
 SocINDEX
 PsycINFO
 Scopus

External links 
 

SAGE Publishing academic journals
English-language journals
Marketing journals
Publications established in 1994
Quarterly journals